Harold Ernest Goettler (July 21, 1890 – October 6, 1918) was a U.S. Army Air Service aviator killed in action on October 6, 1918 while locating the Lost Battalion of the 77th Division during World War I. He died of wounds resulting from German fire from the ground during the flight. For his actions, he posthumously received the Medal of Honor. He attended the University of Chicago, and the Harold E. Goettler Political Institutions Prize awarded to University of Chicago undergraduates is named in his honor.

Medal of Honor citation
Rank and organization: First Lieutenant, pilot, U.S. Air Service, 50th Aero Squadron, Air Service. Place and date: Near Binarville, France, October 6, 1918. Entered service at: Chicago, Ill. Born: July 21, 1890, Chicago, Ill. G.O. No.: 56, W.D., 1922.

Citation:

1st. Lt. Goettler, with his observer, 2d Lt. Erwin R. Bleckley, 130th Field Artillery, left the airdrome late in the afternoon on their second trip to drop supplies to a battalion of the 77th Division which had been cut off by the enemy in the Argonne Forest. Having been subjected on the first trip to violent fire from the enemy, they attempted on the second trip to come still lower in order to get the packages even more precisely on the designated spot. In the course of this mission the plane was brought down by enemy rifle and machinegun fire from the ground, resulting in the instant death of 1st. Lt. Goettler. In attempting and performing this mission 1st. Lt. Goettler showed the highest possible contempt of personal danger, devotion to duty, courage and valor.

See also

 List of Medal of Honor recipients
 List of Medal of Honor recipients for World War I

References

External links
 
 Guide to the Harold E. Goettler Papers 1909–1979 at the University of Chicago Special Collections Research Center

1890 births
1918 deaths
American football tackles
Chicago Maroons football players
American military personnel killed in World War I
United States Army Medal of Honor recipients
United States Army officers
World War I recipients of the Medal of Honor
Players of American football from Chicago
Burials at Graceland Cemetery (Chicago)
Military personnel from Chicago